Savalyapuram is a village in Guntur district of the Indian state of Andhra Pradesh.

References 

Villages in Guntur district
Mandal headquarters in Guntur district